Pachydactylus austeni, also known commonly as Austen's thick-toed gecko or Austen's gecko, is a species of small thick-toed gecko, a lizard in the family Gekkonidae. The species is indigenous to the western coast of South Africa.

Etymology
The specific name, austeni, is in honour of English topographer Henry Haversham Godwin-Austen.

Habitat, behaviour and diet
It lives in a tiny burrow that it digs in the sand, and it leaves its burrow at night to forage for small insects among the dune vegetation.

Description
P. austeni has a smooth, colourful body with large eyes and conspicuous yellow or white eyelids.

Reproduction
P. austeni is oviparous.

References

Further reading
Branch, Bill (2004). Field Guide to Snakes and other Reptiles of Southern Africa. Third Revised edition, Second impression. Sanibel Island, Florida: Ralph Curtis Books. 399 pp. . (Pachydactylus austeni, pp. 250–251 + Plate 82).
Hewitt J (1923). "Descriptions of Two New S. African Geckos of the Genus Pachydactylus ". Annals of the Natal Museum 5: 67–71. (Pachydactylus austeni, new species, pp. 67–69 + Plate IV, figures 1 & 2).
Loveridge A (1947). "Revision of the African Lizards of the Family Gekkonidae". Bulletin of the Museum of Comparative Zoölogy at Harvard College 98 (1): 1–469 + Plates 1–7. (Pachydactylus austeni, p. 349).
Rösler H (2000). "Kommentierte Liste der rezent, subrezent und fossil bekannten Geckotaxa (Reptilia: Gekkonomorpha)". Gekkota 2: 28–153. (Pachydactylus austeni, p. 98). (in German).

A
Endemic reptiles of South Africa
Natural history of Cape Town
Taxa named by John Hewitt (herpetologist)
Reptiles described in 1923
Lizards of Africa
Reptiles of South Africa